The Frillgill conger (Blachea xenobranchialis) is an eel in the family Congridae (conger/garden eels), and the type species in the genus Blachea. It was described by Christine Karrer and David G. Smith in 1980. It is a tropical, marine eel which is known from northwestern Australia, in the Indo-West Pacific. It dwells at a depth range of 348–385 metres, and leads a benthic lifestyle, inhabiting continental shelves and slopes. Males can reach a maximum total length of 47.5 centimetres, while females can reach a maximum TL of 37.5 cm.

The species epithet "xenobranchialis" means "strange gill" in Ancient Greek, and refers to the eel's unusual free branchiostegals.

References

Congridae
Fish described in 1980